This is a list of Estonian television related events from 1963.

Events
 15 October – television magazine "Muusikaelu sündmusi ja probleeme" was started to be published.

Debuts

Television shows

Ending this year

Births

Deaths

See also
 1963 in Estonia

References

1960s in Estonian television